The 31st General Assembly of Nova Scotia represented Nova Scotia between 1894 and 1897.

The Liberal Party led by William Stevens Fielding formed the government. George Henry Murray replaced Fielding as party leader and premier when Fielding entered federal politics in 1896.

Frederick A. Lawrence was chosen as speaker for the house.

The assembly was dissolved on March 20, 1897.

List of Members 

Notes:

References 
 

Terms of the General Assembly of Nova Scotia
1894 establishments in Nova Scotia
1897 disestablishments in Nova Scotia